Prince Witold Leon Karol Adam Jarosław Jerzy Czartoryski (10 February 1864 – 6 September 1945) was a Polish noble (szlachcic) and landowner.  He served as the general commissar of Galicia and Lodomeria from the end of Russian occupation in 1917 to full incorporation as part of Poland on 1 November 1918. He was a hereditary member of the Austrian House of Lords (Herrenhaus) from 1908 and an elected Senator of the Polish Republic (1922–28)

Witold became owner of Pełkinie, Wiązownica, Konarzewo, Byliny estates in Poland and Weinhaus in Vienna.

Witold was a well-known horse racing enthusiast. He set up a world-renowned hot bloods stud in Pełkinie, which bred the remarkable Arabian horses Czubuthan, Babolna, Ba-Ida, Kasmira and Aeniza.

Family

He was married to Countess Jadwiga Dzieduszycka hr. Sas daughter of Count Włodzimierz Dzieduszycki, married on February 21, 1889 in Lwów. They had twelve children together, including:
 Maria Anna Czartoryska
 Anna Maria Czartoryska
 Kazimierz Jerzy Czartoryski
 Jerzy Piotr Czartoryski
 Włodzimierz Alfons Czartoryski
 Jan Franciszek Czartoryski
 Roman Jacek Czartoryski
 Stanisław Ignacy Czartoryski
 Elżbieta Czartoryska
 Adam Michał Czartoryski
 Witold Tadeusz Czartoryski 
 Piotr Michał Czartoryski

References

Bibliography
 Wincenty Witos, Dzieła Wybrane, tom I: Moje wspomnienia, cz. I, Wyd. LSW, Warszawa 1988.
 Zygmunt Kaczmarek, Marszałkowie Senatu II Rzeczypospolitej, Wydawnictwo Sejmowe 1992.
 Stanisław Grodziski, Sejm Krajowy galicyjski 1861–1914, Wydawnictwo Sejmowe Warszawa 1993.
 "Kto był kim w Drugiej Rzeczypospolitej", red. nauk. prof. Jacek M. Majchrowski przy współpracy Grzegorza Mazura i Kamila Stepana, Polska Oficyna Wydawnucza "BGW", Warszawa 1994.
 Michał Czajka, Marcin Kamler, Witold Sienkiewicz, Leksykon Historii Polski, Wyd. Wiedza Powszechna, Warszawa 1995.
 Tomasz Lenczewski, Genealogie rodów utytułowanych w Polsce, Warszawa 1995- 1996.
 Józef Buszko, Polacy w parlamencie wiedeńskim 1848–1918, Warszawa 1996.

Witold Leon
Polish Austro-Hungarians
1864 births
1945 deaths